X Rebirth is a single-player space trading and combat game developed by Egosoft, published by Deep Silver (Europe) and Tri Synergy (America). It is the sixth installment in the X universe adventure video game series, following X3: Albion Prelude (2012), as the new sequel to the last game title. The game runs on Linux, macOS and Microsoft Windows. Egosoft Director Bernd Lehahn has stated that X Rebirth will not be available on consoles.

Gameplay
X Rebirth incorporates open-ended (or "sandbox") gameplay. As with previous installments in the series the game takes place in a universe that is active even when the player is not present, involving simulated trade, combat, piracy, and other features. The player as an individual may take part in these or other actions to gain notoriety or wealth, going so far as to be able to construct their own space installations and command fleets of starships, establishing what amounts to their own personal empire and dynamically and drastically altering the game world in the process.

Prior to launch, the developers announced that X Rebirth would feature a new interface design, intended to reduce the initial complexity for new players. However, they asserted that the game mechanics would remain comparable in complexity to those found in previous X series titles. However, after release, many people attacked a lot of the design decisions made by Egosoft, and a number of customers requested refunds.

On 12 March 2015 the first version (build 0) was released for Linux.

Synopsis
Its story shows a more focused effort on specific characters than Egosoft's previous 'X' effort:

Reception

The game has been received negatively by critics, holding the score of 33/100 on Metacritic, indicating "generally unfavorable reviews".

As of 23 March 2014, X Rebirth has received 25 patches since release, although the game is widely regarded as being a disappointment following from previous successes in the series.

In April 2014, X Rebirth 2.0 became available, delivering a number of patch fixes and gameplay improvements.

Egosoft released the first downloadable content (DLC) for X Rebirth on 11 December entitled The Teladi Outpost including a host of fixes and improvements to the base game. This update, delivered exclusively for the 64 bit platform, brought the release to version 3.0. The Teladi Outpost DLC features a new system containing two sectors. On the days surrounding and during the weeks following the update, Egosoft delivered a number of video tutorials to YouTube covering many common facets of gameplay.

See also
List of PC games

References

External links

 Argonopedia, the X series wiki

2013 video games
Science fiction video games
Space trading and combat simulators
Video games developed in Germany
Video game sequels
Windows games
MacOS games
Linux games
X (video game series)
Deep Silver games
Video games with Steam Workshop support
Video games set in the 30th century
Tri Synergy games
Single-player video games

de:X (Spieleserie)#X Rebirth